Christian Conrad Sophus, Count Danneskiold-Samsøe (29 August 1836 - 1 November 1908), normally referred to as Christian Danneskiold-Samsøe, was member of the Danish comital family Danneskiold-Samsøe, landowner and administrative leader of the Royal Danish Theatre.

Early life and education
He was born in Copenhagen as the son of Postmaster-General Sophus Danneskiold-Samsøe and Frederikke Marie Danneskiold-Samsøe née Levetzow. He completed secondary school in 1855 and became cand. polit. from the University of Copenhagen in 1861.

Career
He headed the court of crown prince Frederik (Frederik VIII) in 1869-76.

He was largely unknown by the general public when he succeeded Edvard Fallesen as head of the Royal Danish Theatre in August 1904. His appointment was met with skepticism but he soon gained recognition for his work with restoring the economy of the theatre.

Property
His wife brought Annerup and Christiansholm into the marriage, transferring ownership of both properties ton him in collection with the marriage. The two properties were sold in 1874 and 1900. In 1894, he succeeded his father as the owner of  Nordfeld, Ålebækgård and Klosterskov on Møn.

Personal life
He married Wanda Sophie Elisabeth Candia Zahrtmann (12 August 1842 - 27 April 1916) on 22 January 1863. She was a daughter of captain and later vice admiral and naval minister C. C. Zahrtmann  and a cousin of the painter Kristian Zahrtmann. They had six children:
  Christian Valdemar Danneskiold-Samsøe (16 February 1864 - 14 March 1931)
 Frederikke Sophie Elisabeth Danneskiold-Samsøe (26 June 1865 - 8 July 1949)
 Elisabeth Danneskiold-Samsøe (28 October 1866 - 1950)
 Ove Danneskiold-Samsøe (22 December 1867 - 8 April 1947)
 Viggo Danneskiold-Samsøe (29 May 1874 - 24 January 1936)
 Knud Danneskiold-Samsøe (26 June 1876 - 22 July 1957)

Honours

References

Danish counts
19th-century Danish landowners
20th-century Danish landowners
Danish arts administrators
University of Copenhagen alumni
1836 births
1908 deaths
Danish Freemasons
Danneskiold-Samsøe family
Danish nobility
Recipients of the Cross of Honour of the Order of the Dannebrog
Grand Crosses of the Order of the Dannebrog
Grand Crosses of the Order of Christ (Portugal)
Commanders Grand Cross of the Order of the Polar Star
Knights of the Order of Charles XIII
Honorary Knights Commander of the Royal Victorian Order